1405 Sibelius, provisional designation , is a stony Florian asteroid from the inner regions of the asteroid belt, approximately 8 kilometers in diameter. It was discovered on 12 September 1936, by Finnish astronomer Yrjö Väisälä at Turku Observatory in Southwest Finland. The asteroid was named after composer Jean Sibelius.

Orbit and classification 

Sibelius is a member of the Flora family, one of the largest populations of stony asteroids in the entire main-belt. It orbits the Sun in the inner main-belt at a distance of 1.9–2.6 AU once every 3 years and 5 months (1,234 days). Its orbit has an eccentricity of 0.15 and an inclination of 7° with respect to the ecliptic. The body's observation arc begins with an observation taken at Turku two weeks prior to its official discovery observation.

Physical characteristics 

Sibelius has been characterized as an S-type asteroid by Pan-STARRS photometric survey.

Rotation period 

In October 2007, a rotational lightcurve of Sibelius was obtained from photometric observations taken by Petr Pravec at the Ondřejov Observatory in the Czech Republic. Lightcurve analysis gave a rotation period of 6.051 hours with a brightness variation of 0.11 magnitude.

Diameter and albedo 

According to the surveys carried out by the Infrared Astronomical Satellite IRAS and NASA's Wide-field Infrared Survey Explorer (WISE) with its subsequent NEOWISE mission, Sibelius measures between 6.21 and 12.18 kilometers in diameter and its surface has an albedo between 0.14 and 0.48. The Collaborative Asteroid Lightcurve Link adopts an albedo of 0.3191 and a diameter of 7.20 kilometers from Petr Pravec's revised WISE thermal observations.

Naming 

This minor planet was named for Jean Sibelius (1865–1957), Finnish violinist and composer of the late Romantic and early-modern periods. The official  was published by the Minor Planet Center on 20 February 1976.

Notes

References

External links 
 Asteroid Lightcurve Database (LCDB), query form (info )
 Dictionary of Minor Planet Names, Google books
 Asteroids and comets rotation curves, CdR – Observatoire de Genève, Raoul Behrend
 Discovery Circumstances: Numbered Minor Planets (1)-(5000) – Minor Planet Center
 
 

 

001405
Discoveries by Yrjö Väisälä
Named minor planets
19360912
Things named after Jean Sibelius